General elections were held in the Netherlands on 21 May 1986. The Christian Democratic Appeal (CDA) emerged as the largest party, winning 54 of the 150 seats in the House of Representatives.

The incumbent CDA-VVD coalition maintained exactly the same number of seats as they had achieved at the last general election and continued working together in government with the CDA's Ruud Lubbers as Prime Minister.

Results

By province

References

Further reading
Gladdish, Ken. "The Centre Holds: the 1986 Netherlands Election," West European Politics  (1987). 10#1 pp. 115–119

1986
1986 elections in the Netherlands
May 1986 events in Europe